Robin Lucas Colin King (born 15 February 1959) has been Archdeacon of Stansted in the Diocese of Chelmsford since 2013.

Born in Quebec, Canada, King was educated at The King's School, Canterbury, Dundee University and Ridley Hall, Cambridge. He was ordained deacon in 1989 and priest in 1990. After a curacy at St Augustine, Ipswich he was Vicar of St Mary, Bures then Rural Dean of Sudbury before his appointment. He was an Honorary Canon of Chelmsford Cathedral from 2008 until 2013.

References

1959 births
People from Quebec
People educated at The King's School, Canterbury
Alumni of the University of Dundee
Alumni of Ridley Hall, Cambridge
Archdeacons of Stansted
Living people